Erika Figge (born January 9, 1985, in Orange, California) is a water polo player from the United States, playing as an attacker. She was a debutant at the US Women's Water Polo Team that won the silver medal at the 2005 World Aquatics Championships in Montréal, Canada.

Career
In June, 2009, Figge was named to the USA Water Polo Women's Senior National Team for the 2009 FINA World Championships.

International competitions
2003 – 2003 FINA Junior World Championships, Calgary, Canada (2nd place)
2005 – 2005 FINA Junior World Championships, Perth, Australia (1st place)
2005 – FINA World League, Kirishi, Russia (5th place)
2005 – World Championships, Montréa, Canada (2nd place)
2006 – 2006 FINA Women's World League, Cosenza, Italy (1st place)
2006 – 2006 Holiday Cup, Los Alamitos, USA (1st place)
2006 – 2006 FINA Women's World Cup, Tianjin, China (4th place)
2007 – FINA World League Super Final, Montreal, Canada (1st place)
2007 – Pan American Games, Rio de Janeiro, Brazil (1st place)

See also
 List of World Aquatics Championships medalists in water polo

References

Profile
US Water Polo

1985 births
Living people
American female water polo players
Sportspeople from Orange, California
World Aquatics Championships medalists in water polo
Pan American Games gold medalists for the United States
Pan American Games medalists in water polo
Water polo players at the 2007 Pan American Games
Medalists at the 2007 Pan American Games
21st-century American women